Richard John Sutcliffe (born 18 September 1954) is a former English cricketer active from 1977 to 1979 who played for Lancashire. He was born in Rochdale. He appeared in one first-class match as a righthanded batsman who bowled right arm medium pace. He scored 10 runs with a highest score of 10* and took one wicket with a best analysis of one for 37.

Notes

1954 births
English cricketers
Cheshire cricketers
Lancashire cricketers
Living people